Kirill Valeryevich Romanov (born 27 October 1980) is a former Russian professional football player.

Club career
He made his Russian Football National League debut for FC Gazovik-Gazprom Izhevsk on 10 April 2003 in a game against FC Kristall Smolensk.

External links
 

1980 births
Living people
Russian footballers
Association football midfielders
FC Bashinformsvyaz-Dynamo Ufa players
FC Izhevsk players
FC Zenit-Izhevsk players